Jerry Hubert Geisler (July 6, 1934 – May 6, 2012) was an American lawyer and Republican politician. He was first elected in 1965 to represent Carroll, Grayson, Galax City in the Virginia House of Delegates, defeating Hillsville mayor Raleigh Cooley. In 1974, he was selected by the members of his caucus to be minority leader, a position in which he served until he was defeated for election in the reorganized 5th district in 1981.

References

External links 
 

1934 births
2012 deaths
Emory and Henry College alumni
University of Richmond School of Law alumni
Republican Party members of the Virginia House of Delegates
People from Big Stone Gap, Virginia
People from Carroll County, Virginia
20th-century American politicians